Frédérick "Freddy" Gaudreau (born May 1, 1993) is a Canadian professional ice hockey centre currently playing for the Minnesota Wild of the National Hockey League (NHL).

Early life
Gaudreau was born on May 1, 1993, in Bromont, Quebec, Canada as the youngest child of parents Jean-Pierre Gaudreau and France Desrosiers. He attended Cégep de Shawinigan while playing in the Quebec Major Junior Hockey League and drove two hours from Drummondville to Shawinigan in order to graduate.

Playing career

Junior
As a youth, Gaudreau played in the 2006 Quebec International Pee-Wee Hockey Tournament with a minor ice hockey team from Missisquoi, Quebec. While playing midget hockey in the QMAAA with the Magog Cantonniers, Gaudreau suffered a severe wrist injury, turning him off the radar for junior scouts. However, due to a rule change allowing 17 year olds to continue playing midget ice hockey, Gaudreau was chosen by the Shawinigan Cataractes in the Quebec Major Junior Hockey League (QMJHL) as a walk-on in 2011.

In his rookie season with the Cataractes, he played in 64 games as the team won the 2012 Memorial Cup. Two years later, he was named the team's 57th captain in franchise history. His time as captain was shortlived, however, as he was traded to the Drummondville Voltigeurs in exchange for a first round pick in 2015, a second round pick in 2014, and Antoine Kilanowski. His only season with the Voltigeurs proved to be successful as he earned the Frank J. Selke Memorial Trophy as the QMJHL's most sportsmanlike player and was courted by at least four professional teams.

Professional
Undrafted, Gaudreau signed his first professional contract with the Milwaukee Admirals of the AHL, on June 12, 2014. In the 2014–15 season, he added to the depth of the Milwaukee attack, contributing with 11 points in 43 games. He was also loaned for 14 games to ECHL partner, the Cincinnati Cyclones, producing 5 goals. On May 21, 2015, Gaudreau was extended by the Admirals for a further season. 

In the midst of a break-out 2015–16 season, having established himself in a scoring role with the Admirals, Gaudreau was signed to a two-year, entry-level contract with the NHL affiliate, the Nashville Predators on January 6, 2016. He completed the season in the AHL, placing third on the Admirals in scoring with new professional highs with 15 goals and 42 points in 75 games.

After attending the Predators' training camp, he was reassigned to continue with Milwaukee to begin the 2016–17 season. On October 22, 2016, Gaudreau received his first NHL recall to the Predators, after the team suffered a bout of food poisoning. He immediately made his NHL debut with the Predators in a 5–1 victory over the Pittsburgh Penguins. He was returned to the Admirals following the game.

In Game 5 of the 2017 Western Conference Finals against the Anaheim Ducks, Gaudreau made his playoff debut after injuries to Ryan Johansen and Mike Fisher necessitated his presence in the line-up. Gaudreau scored the winning goal in the Predators' 5–1 victory over the Pittsburgh Penguins in Game 3 of the 2017 Stanley Cup Finals. In Game 4, Gaudreau again scored the game winner as the Predators defeated the Penguins 4–1 to even the series at two games apiece. In doing so, Gaudreau became the first player since Johnny Harms of the 1943–44 Chicago Black Hawks to score his first three career NHL goals in the Stanley Cup Finals.

After six seasons within the Predators organization, Gaudreau left as a free agent to sign a one-year, two-way contract with the Pittsburgh Penguins on October 10, 2020. Beginning the pandemic delayed  season with AHL affiliate, the Wilkes-Barre/Scranton Penguins, Gaudreau was recalled and after he was inserted into the lineup he established career-highs with 8 assists and 10 points in just 19 games. Remaining a fixture in the playoffs, Gaudreau led the club in plus-minus (+3) and recorded 1 goal and 3 points through 6 games.

As a free agent at the conclusion of his contract with the Penguins, Gaudreau was rewarded for a successful season in signing a two-year, $2.4 million contract with the Minnesota Wild on July 28, 2021. Freddy Gaudreau was featured in a "Becoming Wild" video about off-season training in the Minnesota Wild video on Nov 9, 2021.

Career statistics

Awards and honours

References

External links
 

1993 births
Canadian ice hockey centres
Cincinnati Cyclones (ECHL) players
Drummondville Voltigeurs players
Living people
Milwaukee Admirals players
Minnesota Wild players
Nashville Predators players
Pittsburgh Penguins players
People from Granby, Quebec
Ice hockey people from Quebec
Shawinigan Cataractes players
Undrafted National Hockey League players
Wilkes-Barre/Scranton Penguins players